Toby L. J. Howard is an Honorary Reader in the Department of Computer Science at the University of Manchester in the UK, He was  Director of undergraduate studies 2011–2019. He retired from the University in July 2020.

Education
Howard was educated at Birkenhead School, and then the University of Manchester receiving a Bachelor of Science degree in computer science and a Master of Science degree in 1983 for work on the graphics facilities of the MU6 network.

Research
Howard's research interests are computer graphics and virtual environments. as a member of the Advanced Interfaces Group (AIG) and has supervised several doctoral students. Howard's research projects have included:
 Virtual reality as a rehabilitative technology for phantom limb experience, investigating using virtual environments for treating phantom limb pain in amputees.
 Augmented reality, with preliminary work on an interactive display for public engagement.
 Virtual environments for psychology research. Telepresence and telepathy in immersive virtual reality; used immersive virtual environments to test for telepathic effects:
 Augmented Reality Image Synthesis (ARIS): augmenting photographs with correctly illuminated objects in real time.
 Virtual environments for crime scene investigation. We worked with Greater Manchester Police on the REVEAL project, investigating reconstructing crime scenes using virtual environments with accurate global illumination.
 VR for large-scale applications" (VRLSA) – concentrated on the development of industrial applications and resulted in the release of MAVERIK VR kernel.

Teaching
Howard taught on COMP27112 Computer Graphics and Image Processing and COMP37111 Advanced Computer Graphics. He founded and led the annual UK Schools Computer Animation Competition from 2008 to 2018. From 1989 to 1998 he was joint editor of Britain's The Skeptic magazine.

References

Academics of the University of Manchester
People associated with the Department of Computer Science, University of Manchester
Living people
Year of birth missing (living people)